The Itombwe Nature Reserve is a protected area in the Itombwe Mountains of the eastern Democratic Republic of the Congo.
It is part of a Lion Conservation Unit. The reserve is home to the critically endangered eastern lowland gorilla (Gorilla beringei graueri).

The national government declared the reserve in 2006, but its boundaries and the uses permitted within the park were not defined in the declaration. After consultations with local people, the boundaries and use zones within the park were formalized in June 2016. The park is divided into three zones: a conservation zone for wildlife with no human use; a multiple-use zone which allows limited human use and sustainable resource extraction; and a development zone which includes villages where sustainable development projects are encouraged.

References

Albertine Rift montane forests
Protected areas of the Democratic Republic of the Congo
South Kivu